The 1975 VFL season was the 79th season of the Victorian Football League (VFL), the highest level senior Australian rules football competition in Victoria. The season featured twelve clubs, ran from 5 April until 27 September, and comprised a 22-game home-and-away season followed by a finals series featuring the top five clubs.

The premiership was won by the North Melbourne Football Club, after it defeated  by 55 points in the VFL Grand Final. It was North Melbourne's first premiership, making it the last of the league's twelve clubs to win a premiership.

Premiership season
In 1975, the VFL competition consisted of twelve teams of 18 on-the-field players each, plus two substitute players, known as the 19th man and the 20th man. A player could be substituted for any reason; however, once substituted, a player could not return to the field of play under any circumstances.

Teams played each other in a home-and-away season of 22 rounds; matches 12 to 22 were the "home-and-way reverse" of matches 1 to 11 (except that rounds 14 and 15 were the reverse of 4 and 3 respectively).

Once the 22 round home-and-away season had finished, the 1975 VFL Premiers were determined by the specific format and conventions of the "McIntyre final five system".

Round 1

|- bgcolor="#CCCCFF"
| Home team
| Home team score
| Away team
| Away team score
| Venue
| Crowd
| Date
|- bgcolor="#FFFFFF"
| 
| 15.15 (105)
| 
| 11.10 (76)
| Princes Park
| 14,417
| 5 April 1975
|- bgcolor="#FFFFFF"
| 
| 14.14 (98)
| 
| 15.13 (103)
| Junction Oval
| 14,442
| 5 April 1975
|- bgcolor="#FFFFFF"
| 
| 21.10 (136)
| 
| 9.13 (67)
| Windy Hill
| 19,165
| 5 April 1975
|- bgcolor="#FFFFFF"
| 
| 12.19 (91)
| 
| 8.7 (55)
| Victoria Park
| 19,000
| 5 April 1975
|- bgcolor="#FFFFFF"
| 
| 17.9 (111)
| 
| 15.10 (100)
| MCG
| 23,422
| 5 April 1975
|- bgcolor="#FFFFFF"
| 
| 8.14 (62)
| 
| 13.16 (94)
| Kardinia Park
| 22,573
| 5 April 1975

Round 2

|- bgcolor="#CCCCFF"
| Home team
| Home team score
| Away team
| Away team score
| Venue
| Crowd
| Date
|- bgcolor="#FFFFFF"
| 
| 27.10 (172)
| 
| 10.19 (79)
| Princes Park
| 38,000
| 12 April 1975
|- bgcolor="#FFFFFF"
| 
| 15.13 (103)
| 
| 16.9 (105)
| Arden Street Oval
| 14,235
| 12 April 1975
|- bgcolor="#FFFFFF"
| 
| 11.15 (81)
| 
| 17.19 (121)
| Moorabbin Oval
| 18,465
| 12 April 1975
|- bgcolor="#FFFFFF"
| 
| 15.22 (112)
| 
| 10.12 (72)
| MCG
| 33,600
| 12 April 1975
|- bgcolor="#FFFFFF"
| 
| 17.14 (116)
| 
| 11.17 (83)
| Western Oval
| 17,700
| 12 April 1975
|- bgcolor="#FFFFFF"
| 
| 15.12 (102)
| 
| 19.17 (131)
| Lake Oval
| 17,466
| 12 April 1975

Round 3

|- bgcolor="#CCCCFF"
| Home team
| Home team score
| Away team
| Away team score
| Venue
| Crowd
| Date
|- bgcolor="#FFFFFF"
| 
| 11.21 (87)
| 
| 9.17 (71)
| Moorabbin Oval
| 15,736
| 19 April 1975
|- bgcolor="#FFFFFF"
| 
| 16.21 (117)
| 
| 15.10 (100)
| Windy Hill
| 22,824
| 19 April 1975
|- bgcolor="#FFFFFF"
| 
| 14.18 (102)
| 
| 9.12 (66)
| Princes Park
| 23,824
| 19 April 1975
|- bgcolor="#FFFFFF"
| 
| 13.12 (90)
| 
| 14.14 (98)
| Kardinia Park
| 17,158
| 19 April 1975
|- bgcolor="#FFFFFF"
| 
| 12.13 (85)
| 
| 12.15 (87)
| Junction Oval
| 17,626
| 19 April 1975
|- bgcolor="#FFFFFF"
| 
| 12.15 (87)
| 
| 17.14 (116)
| VFL Park
| 39,496
| 19 April 1975

Round 4

|- bgcolor="#CCCCFF"
| Home team
| Home team score
| Away team
| Away team score
| Venue
| Crowd
| Date
|- bgcolor="#FFFFFF"
| 
| 12.8 (80)
| 
| 18.25 (133)
| MCG
| 35,328
| 25 April 1975
|- bgcolor="#FFFFFF"
| 
| 12.15 (87)
| 
| 16.8 (104)
| VFL Park
| 77,770
| 25 April 1975
|- bgcolor="#FFFFFF"
| 
| 16.13 (109)
| 
| 4.19 (43)
| Western Oval
| 25,388
| 26 April 1975
|- bgcolor="#FFFFFF"
| 
| 17.10 (112)
| 
| 14.15 (99)
| Victoria Park
| 24,296
| 26 April 1975
|- bgcolor="#FFFFFF"
| 
| 9.15 (69)
| 
| 13.21 (99)
| Lake Oval
| 12,666
| 26 April 1975
|- bgcolor="#FFFFFF"
| 
| 11.19 (85)
| 
| 17.13 (115)
| Arden Street Oval
| 12,707
| 26 April 1975

Round 5

|- bgcolor="#CCCCFF"
| Home team
| Home team score
| Away team
| Away team score
| Venue
| Crowd
| Date
|- bgcolor="#FFFFFF"
| 
| 19.23 (137)
| 
| 12.14 (86)
| MCG
| 25,296
| 3 May 1975
|- bgcolor="#FFFFFF"
| 
| 19.22 (136)
| 
| 11.15 (81)
| Princes Park
| 10,622
| 3 May 1975
|- bgcolor="#FFFFFF"
| 
| 11.5 (71)
| 
| 12.15 (87)
| Kardinia Park
| 17,042
| 3 May 1975
|- bgcolor="#FFFFFF"
| 
| 19.11 (125)
| 
| 16.17 (113)
| Junction Oval
| 20,350
| 3 May 1975
|- bgcolor="#FFFFFF"
| 
| 7.16 (58)
| 
| 12.19 (91)
| Moorabbin Oval
| 24,275
| 3 May 1975
|- bgcolor="#FFFFFF"
| 
| 12.9 (81)
| 
| 9.16 (70)
| VFL Park
| 36,638
| 3 May 1975

Round 6

|- bgcolor="#CCCCFF"
| Home team
| Home team score
| Away team
| Away team score
| Venue
| Crowd
| Date
|- bgcolor="#FFFFFF"
| 
| 22.23 (155)
| 
| 13.12 (90)
| MCG
| 15,503
| 10 May 1975
|- bgcolor="#FFFFFF"
| 
| 12.21 (93)
| 
| 15.14 (104)
| Windy Hill
| 17,225
| 10 May 1975
|- bgcolor="#FFFFFF"
| 
| 14.12 (96)
| 
| 22.14 (146)
| Victoria Park
| 27,729
| 10 May 1975
|- bgcolor="#FFFFFF"
| 
| 16.15 (111)
| 
| 12.13 (85)
| Princes Park
| 27,907
| 10 May 1975
|- bgcolor="#FFFFFF"
| 
| 18.11 (119)
| 
| 9.12 (66)
| Arden Street Oval
| 18,875
| 10 May 1975
|- bgcolor="#FFFFFF"
| 
| 9.20 (74)
| 
| 11.16 (82)
| VFL Park
| 18,229
| 10 May 1975

Round 7

|- bgcolor="#CCCCFF"
| Home team
| Home team score
| Away team
| Away team score
| Venue
| Crowd
| Date
|- bgcolor="#FFFFFF"
| 
| 13.10 (88)
| 
| 11.14 (80)
| Kardinia Park
| 13,733
| 17 May 1975
|- bgcolor="#FFFFFF"
| 
| 19.18 (132)
| 
| 10.18 (78)
| MCG
| 29,131
| 17 May 1975
|- bgcolor="#FFFFFF"
| 
| 19.16 (130)
| 
| 13.12 (90)
| Princes Park
| 10,389
| 17 May 1975
|- bgcolor="#FFFFFF"
| 
| 8.12 (60)
| 
| 14.17 (101)
| Western Oval
| 26,204
| 17 May 1975
|- bgcolor="#FFFFFF"
| 
| 11.11 (77)
| 
| 19.14 (128)
| Lake Oval
| 14,142
| 17 May 1975
|- bgcolor="#FFFFFF"
| 
| 12.18 (90)
| 
| 12.9 (81)
| VFL Park
| 29,354
| 17 May 1975

Round 8

|- bgcolor="#CCCCFF"
| Home team
| Home team score
| Away team
| Away team score
| Venue
| Crowd
| Date
|- bgcolor="#FFFFFF"
| 
| 11.8 (74)
| 
| 9.12 (66)
| Arden Street Oval
| 20,257
| 24 May 1975
|- bgcolor="#FFFFFF"
| 
| 13.13 (91)
| 
| 11.12 (78)
| Junction Oval
| 12,010
| 24 May 1975
|- bgcolor="#FFFFFF"
| 
| 16.14 (110)
| 
| 11.15 (81)
| Princes Park
| 18,788
| 24 May 1975
|- bgcolor="#FFFFFF"
| 
| 7.23 (65)
| 
| 7.12 (54)
| Moorabbin Oval
| 16,838
| 24 May 1975
|- bgcolor="#FFFFFF"
| 
| 7.13 (55)
| 
| 12.9 (81)
| Windy Hill
| 31,986
| 24 May 1975
|- bgcolor="#FFFFFF"
| 
| 5.10 (40)
| 
| 17.11 (113)
| VFL Park
| 23,466
| 24 May 1975

Round 9

|- bgcolor="#CCCCFF"
| Home team
| Home team score
| Away team
| Away team score
| Venue
| Crowd
| Date
|- bgcolor="#FFFFFF"
| 
| 8.10 (58)
| 
| 20.14 (134)
| Western Oval
| 15,933
| 31 May 1975
|- bgcolor="#FFFFFF"
| 
| 15.8 (98)
| 
| 13.11 (89)
| Victoria Park
| 22,695
| 31 May 1975
|- bgcolor="#FFFFFF"
| 
| 16.19 (115)
| 
| 9.13 (67)
| Princes Park
| 32,576
| 31 May 1975
|- bgcolor="#FFFFFF"
| 
| 11.26 (92)
| 
| 7.13 (55)
| Lake Oval
| 9,880
| 31 May 1975
|- bgcolor="#FFFFFF"
| 
| 18.15 (123)
| 
| 17.10 (112)
| MCG
| 16,244
| 31 May 1975
|- bgcolor="#FFFFFF"
| 
| 11.17 (83)
| 
| 15.8 (98)
| VFL Park
| 28,936
| 31 May 1975

Round 10

|- bgcolor="#CCCCFF"
| Home team
| Home team score
| Away team
| Away team score
| Venue
| Crowd
| Date
|- bgcolor="#FFFFFF"
| 
| 14.20 (104)
| 
| 14.14 (98)
| Kardinia Park
| 13,328
| 7 June 1975
|- bgcolor="#FFFFFF"
| 
| 15.9 (99)
| 
| 17.19 (121)
| Moorabbin Oval
| 17,811
| 7 June 1975
|- bgcolor="#FFFFFF"
| 
| 19.14 (128)
| 
| 12.9 (81)
| MCG
| 49,469
| 7 June 1975
|- bgcolor="#FFFFFF"
| 
| 19.24 (138)
| 
| 13.11 (89)
| Princes Park
| 23,830
| 7 June 1975
|- bgcolor="#FFFFFF"
| 
| 15.7 (97)
| 
| 16.10 (106)
| Junction Oval
| 16,249
| 7 June 1975
|- bgcolor="#FFFFFF"
| 
| 13.11 (89)
| 
| 12.15 (87)
| VFL Park
| 14,056
| 7 June 1975

Round 11

|- bgcolor="#CCCCFF"
| Home team
| Home team score
| Away team
| Away team score
| Venue
| Crowd
| Date
|- bgcolor="#FFFFFF"
| 
| 13.12 (90)
| 
| 21.20 (146)
| Windy Hill
| 23,244
| 16 June 1975
|- bgcolor="#FFFFFF"
| 
| 19.13 (127)
| 
| 17.13 (115)
| Princes Park
| 25,147
| 16 June 1975
|- bgcolor="#FFFFFF"
| 
| 12.16 (88)
| 
| 16.12 (108)
| Lake Oval
| 16,037
| 16 June 1975
|- bgcolor="#FFFFFF"
| 
| 13.19 (97)
| 
| 14.11 (95)
| Kardinia Park
| 19,030
| 16 June 1975
|- bgcolor="#FFFFFF"
| 
| 14.11 (95)
| 
| 9.19 (73)
| MCG
| 42,803
| 16 June 1975
|- bgcolor="#FFFFFF"
| 
| 14.18 (102)
| 
| 13.12 (90)
| VFL Park
| 33,653
| 16 June 1975

Round 12

|- bgcolor="#CCCCFF"
| Home team
| Home team score
| Away team
| Away team score
| Venue
| Crowd
| Date
|- bgcolor="#FFFFFF"
| 
| 20.11 (131)
| 
| 14.8 (92)
| Western Oval
| 14,204
| 21 June 1975
|- bgcolor="#FFFFFF"
| 
| 23.19 (157)
| 
| 12.14 (86)
| Princes Park
| 16,983
| 21 June 1975
|- bgcolor="#FFFFFF"
| 
| 13.17 (95)
| 
| 18.12 (120)
| Arden Street Oval
| 15,478
| 21 June 1975
|- bgcolor="#FFFFFF"
| 
| 13.18 (96)
| 
| 13.20 (98)
| MCG
| 21,049
| 21 June 1975
|- bgcolor="#FFFFFF"
| 
| 21.15 (141)
| 
| 11.7 (73)
| Moorabbin Oval
| 18,987
| 21 June 1975
|- bgcolor="#FFFFFF"
| 
| 11.11 (77)
| 
| 12.13 (85)
| VFL Park
| 21,154
| 21 June 1975

Round 13

|- bgcolor="#CCCCFF"
| Home team
| Home team score
| Away team
| Away team score
| Venue
| Crowd
| Date
|- bgcolor="#FFFFFF"
| 
| 11.19 (85)
| 
| 7.19 (61)
| Princes Park
| 15,464
| 28 June 1975
|- bgcolor="#FFFFFF"
| 
| 8.13 (61)
| 
| 13.14 (92)
| Kardinia Park
| 14,747
| 28 June 1975
|- bgcolor="#FFFFFF"
| 
| 11.10 (76)
| 
| 12.17 (89)
| Junction Oval
| 11,832
| 28 June 1975
|- bgcolor="#FFFFFF"
| 
| 19.18 (132)
| 
| 17.12 (114)
| Windy Hill
| 6,916
| 28 June 1975
|- bgcolor="#FFFFFF"
| 
| 9.12 (66)
| 
| 12.10 (82)
| Victoria Park
| 28,234
| 28 June 1975
|- bgcolor="#FFFFFF"
| 
| 6.10 (46)
| 
| 11.14 (80)
| VFL Park
| 12,631
| 28 June 1975

Round 14

|- bgcolor="#CCCCFF"
| Home team
| Home team score
| Away team
| Away team score
| Venue
| Crowd
| Date
|- bgcolor="#FFFFFF"
| 
| 14.12 (96)
| 
| 15.15 (105)
| Junction Oval
| 10,034
| 5 July 1975
|- bgcolor="#FFFFFF"
| 
| 15.11 (101)
| 
| 6.13 (49)
| Moorabbin Oval
| 14,584
| 5 July 1975
|- bgcolor="#FFFFFF"
| 
| 17.18 (120)
| 
| 12.10 (82)
| MCG
| 29,501
| 5 July 1975
|- bgcolor="#FFFFFF"
| 
| 14.12 (96)
| 
| 9.11 (65)
| Kardinia Park
| 16,579
| 5 July 1975
|- bgcolor="#FFFFFF"
| 
| 15.5 (95)
| 
| 27.13 (175)
| Windy Hill
| 22,632
| 5 July 1975
|- bgcolor="#FFFFFF"
| 
| 9.10 (64)
| 
| 5.9 (39)
| VFL Park
| 14,008
| 5 July 1975

Round 15

|- bgcolor="#CCCCFF"
| Home team
| Home team score
| Away team
| Away team score
| Venue
| Crowd
| Date
|- bgcolor="#FFFFFF"
| 
| 14.10 (94)
| 
| 2.20 (32)
| Princes Park
| 17,115
| 12 July 1975
|- bgcolor="#FFFFFF"
| 
| 13.15 (93)
| 
| 7.7 (49)
| Western Oval
| 12,449
| 12 July 1975
|- bgcolor="#FFFFFF"
| 
| 16.19 (115)
| 
| 11.7 (73)
| Victoria Park
| 17,127
| 12 July 1975
|- bgcolor="#FFFFFF"
| 
| 10.10 (70)
| 
| 19.16 (130)
| Lake Oval
| 11,170
| 12 July 1975
|- bgcolor="#FFFFFF"
| 
| 19.20 (134)
| 
| 16.13 (109)
| MCG
| 16,040
| 12 July 1975
|- bgcolor="#FFFFFF"
| 
| 9.11 (65)
| 
| 5.14 (44)
| VFL Park
| 26,389
| 12 July 1975

Round 16

|- bgcolor="#CCCCFF"
| Home team
| Home team score
| Away team
| Away team score
| Venue
| Crowd
| Date
|- bgcolor="#FFFFFF"
| 
| 16.14 (110)
| 
| 16.7 (103)
| Victoria Park
| 21,746
| 19 July 1975
|- bgcolor="#FFFFFF"
| 
| 11.22 (88)
| 
| 8.27 (75)
| Princes Park
| 21,827
| 19 July 1975
|- bgcolor="#FFFFFF"
| 
| 8.12 (60)
| 
| 26.11 (167)
| Lake Oval
| 13,411
| 19 July 1975
|- bgcolor="#FFFFFF"
| 
| 15.17 (107)
| 
| 17.17 (119)
| MCG
| 18,829
| 19 July 1975
|- bgcolor="#FFFFFF"
| 
| 14.25 (109)
| 
| 6.19 (55)
| Arden Street Oval
| 11,002
| 19 July 1975
|- bgcolor="#FFFFFF"
| 
| 11.11 (77)
| 
| 16.19 (115)
| VFL Park
| 13,582
| 19 July 1975

Round 17

|- bgcolor="#CCCCFF"
| Home team
| Home team score
| Away team
| Away team score
| Venue
| Crowd
| Date
|- bgcolor="#FFFFFF"
| 
| 9.14 (68)
| 
| 17.15 (117)
| Western Oval
| 19,639
| 26 July 1975
|- bgcolor="#FFFFFF"
| 
| 12.15 (87)
| 
| 7.14 (56)
| Moorabbin Oval
| 15,259
| 26 July 1975
|- bgcolor="#FFFFFF"
| 
| 13.16 (94)
| 
| 16.13 (109)
| Kardinia Park
| 14,922
| 26 July 1975
|- bgcolor="#FFFFFF"
| 
| 16.19 (115)
| 
| 10.9 (69)
| MCG
| 56,846
| 26 July 1975
|- bgcolor="#FFFFFF"
| 
| 15.15 (105)
| 
| 15.11 (101)
| Princes Park
| 31,104
| 26 July 1975
|- bgcolor="#FFFFFF"
| 
| 11.9 (75)
| 
| 13.13 (91)
| VFL Park
| 11,427
| 26 July 1975

Round 18

|- bgcolor="#CCCCFF"
| Home team
| Home team score
| Away team
| Away team score
| Venue
| Crowd
| Date
|- bgcolor="#FFFFFF"
| 
| 19.13 (127)
| 
| 12.18 (90)
| MCG
| 25,211
| 2 August 1975
|- bgcolor="#FFFFFF"
| 
| 15.23 (113)
| 
| 10.19 (79)
| Junction Oval
| 9,139
| 2 August 1975
|- bgcolor="#FFFFFF"
| 
| 11.17 (83)
| 
| 19.13 (127)
| Windy Hill
| 15,227
| 2 August 1975
|- bgcolor="#FFFFFF"
| 
| 19.17 (131)
| 
| 15.13 (103)
| Princes Park
| 14,039
| 2 August 1975
|- bgcolor="#FFFFFF"
| 
| 15.20 (110)
| 
| 8.10 (58)
| Arden Street Oval
| 21,559
| 2 August 1975
|- bgcolor="#FFFFFF"
| 
| 11.18 (84)
| 
| 11.14 (80)
| VFL Park
| 16,706
| 2 August 1975

Round 19

|- bgcolor="#CCCCFF"
| Home team
| Home team score
| Away team
| Away team score
| Venue
| Crowd
| Date
|- bgcolor="#FFFFFF"
| 
| 5.16 (46)
| 
| 16.18 (114)
| Western Oval
| 18,107
| 9 August 1975
|- bgcolor="#FFFFFF"
| 
| 20.18 (138)
| 
| 15.9 (99)
| Victoria Park
| 18,664
| 9 August 1975
|- bgcolor="#FFFFFF"
| 
| 13.18 (96)
| 
| 13.23 (101)
| MCG
| 39,664
| 9 August 1975
|- bgcolor="#FFFFFF"
| 
| 25.23 (173)
| 
| 8.7 (55)
| Princes Park
| 8,123
| 9 August 1975
|- bgcolor="#FFFFFF"
| 
| 13.20 (98)
| 
| 16.19 (115)
| Lake Oval
| 9,032
| 9 August 1975
|- bgcolor="#FFFFFF"
| 
| 11.23 (89)
| 
| 7.9 (51)
| VFL Park
| 30,328
| 9 August 1975

Round 20

|- bgcolor="#CCCCFF"
| Home team
| Home team score
| Away team
| Away team score
| Venue
| Crowd
| Date
|- bgcolor="#FFFFFF"
| 
| 12.16 (88)
| 
| 15.15 (105)
| Kardinia Park
| 10,973
| 16 August 1975
|- bgcolor="#FFFFFF"
| 
| 13.22 (100)
| 
| 13.11 (89)
| Junction Oval
| 13,181
| 16 August 1975
|- bgcolor="#FFFFFF"
| 
| 15.15 (105)
| 
| 13.13 (91)
| Windy Hill
| 16,545
| 16 August 1975
|- bgcolor="#FFFFFF"
| 
| 20.17 (137)
| 
| 24.12 (156)
| Moorabbin Oval
| 28,359
| 16 August 1975
|- bgcolor="#FFFFFF"
| 
| 13.20 (98)
| 
| 14.11 (95)
| MCG
| 49,756
| 16 August 1975
|- bgcolor="#FFFFFF"
| 
| 13.13 (91)
| 
| 14.9 (93)
| VFL Park
| 15,601
| 16 August 1975

Round 21

|- bgcolor="#CCCCFF"
| Home team
| Home team score
| Away team
| Away team score
| Venue
| Crowd
| Date
|- bgcolor="#FFFFFF"
| 
| 16.15 (111)
| 
| 6.5 (41)
| Arden Street Oval
| 14,917
| 23 August 1975
|- bgcolor="#FFFFFF"
| 
| 7.15 (57)
| 
| 3.9 (27)
| Victoria Park
| 26,303
| 23 August 1975
|- bgcolor="#FFFFFF"
| 
| 10.14 (74)
| 
| 11.13 (79)
| Princes Park
| 14,779
| 23 August 1975
|- bgcolor="#FFFFFF"
| 
| 8.16 (64)
| 
| 10.10 (70)
| MCG
| 11,022
| 23 August 1975
|- bgcolor="#FFFFFF"
| 
| 10.15 (75)
| 
| 18.7 (115)
| Lake Oval
| 8,659
| 23 August 1975
|- bgcolor="#FFFFFF"
| 
| 17.15 (117)
| 
| 20.16 (136)
| VFL Park
| 23,601
| 23 August 1975

Round 22

|- bgcolor="#CCCCFF"
| Home team
| Home team score
| Away team
| Away team score
| Venue
| Crowd
| Date
|- bgcolor="#FFFFFF"
| 
| 17.14 (116)
| 
| 8.20 (68)
| MCG
| 39,275
| 30 August 1975
|- bgcolor="#FFFFFF"
| 
| 15.19 (109)
| 
| 12.15 (87)
| Arden Street Oval
| 17,031
| 30 August 1975
|- bgcolor="#FFFFFF"
| 
| 14.14 (98)
| 
| 15.7 (97)
| Victoria Park
| 26,940
| 30 August 1975
|- bgcolor="#FFFFFF"
| 
| 14.19 (103)
| 
| 17.8 (110)
| Princes Park
| 11,945
| 30 August 1975
|- bgcolor="#FFFFFF"
| 
| 10.15 (75)
| 
| 18.11 (119)
| Western Oval
| 21,060
| 30 August 1975
|- bgcolor="#FFFFFF"
| 
| 14.9 (93)
| 
| 18.11 (119)
| VFL Park
| 11,075
| 30 August 1975

Ladder

Finals

Elimination final

|- bgcolor="#CCCCFF"
| Home team
| Score
| Away team
| Score
| Venue
| Crowd
| Date
|- bgcolor="#FFFFFF"
| 
| 11.11 (77)
| 
| 10.13 (73)
| VFL Park
| 65,512
| 6 September

Qualifying final

|- bgcolor="#CCCCFF"
| Home team
| Score
| Away team
| Score
| Venue
| Crowd
| Date
|- bgcolor="#FFFFFF"
| 
| 14.12 (96)
| 
| 12.4 (76)
| MCG
| 74,015
| 6 September
|- bgcolor="#FFFFFF"

Semi-finals

|- bgcolor="#CCCCFF"
| Home team
| Score
| Away team
| Score
| Venue
| Crowd
| Date
|- bgcolor="#FFFFFF"
| 
| 9.8 (62)
| 
| 9.17 (71)
| MCG
| 76,967
| 13 September
|- bgcolor="#FFFFFF"
| 
| 12.10 (82)
| 
| 10.11 (71)
| VFL Park
| 52,076
| 13 September

Preliminary final

|- bgcolor="#CCCCFF"
| Home team
| Score
| Away team
| Score
| Venue
| Crowd
| Date
|- bgcolor="#FFFFFF"
| 
| 10.16 (76)
| 
| 8.11 (59)
| VFL Park
| 71,130
| 20 September

Grand final

North Melbourne defeated Hawthorn 19.8 (122) to 9.13 (67), in front of a crowd of 110,551 people. (For an explanation of scoring see Australian rules football).

|- bgcolor="#CCCCFF"
| Home team
| Score
| Away team
| Score
| Venue
| Crowd
| Date
|- bgcolor="#FFFFFF"
| 
| 9.13 (67)
| 
| 19.8 (122)
| MCG
| 110,551
| 27 September 1975
|- bgcolor="#FFFFFF"

Awards
 The 1975 VFL premiership team was North Melbourne.
 The VFL's leading goalkicker was Leigh Matthews of Hawthorn who kicked 68 goals (including one goal in the finals).
 The winner of the 1975 Brownlow Medal was Gary Dempsey of Footscray with 20 votes.
 South Melbourne took the "wooden spoon" in 1975.
Geelong 16.18 (114) defeated  11.17 (83) in the grand final, held as a curtain-raiser to the seniors Grand Final at the Melbourne Cricket Ground on 27 September.

Notable events
 Football matches were telecast in colour, following the official launch of colour television in Australia on 1 March 1975. In response to this, many clubs adopted brighter playing colours:  changed its colours from maroon, blue and white to red, blue and gold;  changed the primary colour of its guernsey from navy blue to royal blue; and other clubs adopted coloured home shorts to replace the black they had previously worn.
 The centre square replaced the centre diamond (which had been used throughout the 1973 and 1974 VFL seasons).
 There was a wild brawl in the Round 1 match between Hawthorn and North Melbourne involving 34 of the 36 players. Hawthorn's Don Scott and North Melbourne's Brad Smith did not participate. There were no reports from this match.
 Footscray had three new, highly talented recruits from interstate in 1975: 183 cm centreman Peter Featherby from Subiaco Football Club in the West Australian National Football League (WANFL), 183 cm forward Ian Low from Manuka Football Club in the Canberra Australian National Football League (CANFL), and 190.5 cm forward-flanker Neil Sachse from North Adelaide Football Club in the South Australian National Football League (SANFL). In an accidental collision in the Round 2 match against Fitzroy at the Western Oval, Neil Sachse was badly injured and became a quadriplegic. 
 On 17 June, Hawthorn announced that it had given full-forward Peter Hudson who had only played three and a half games for Hawthorn in three years, a clearance to Glenorchy.
 The second quarter of the round 14 match between Carlton and Essendon at Windy Hill lasted almost 40 minutes, with Carlton scoring 14.1 (85) to Essendon's 4.1 (25) for a record quarter aggregate score of 18.2 (110). It is the first quarter to beat South Melbourne's 1919 team record of 17.4 (106).
Near the end of the quarter, a massive brawl involving all 36 players erupted when Essendon centreman Neville Fields ran past Carlton forward Craig Davis and king-hit him in retaliation for some supposed earlier act of aggression against an Essendon player. Noticing the unconscious Davis, both Rod Ashman and Rod Austin ran to remonstrate with Fields, followed by their Carlton team-mates, and the fight was on. Carlton's Phillip Pinnell knocked out Essendon's Dean Hartigan.It took a long time for the match to resume. Field umpire Ian Robinson was showered with cans by spectators. Eight players were reported. Many more players would have been reported had the umpires been able to turn their attention elsewhere (the VFL responded to this problem by introducing two field umpires in the following season).The tribunal decisions were:
 Rod Ashman of Carlton was suspended for 4 weeks, for striking Neville Fields.
 Rod Austin of Carlton was suspended for 4 weeks, for striking Neville Fields.
 Phillip Pinnell of Carlton was suspended for 2 weeks, for striking Robin Close.
 David McKay of Carlton was found guilty of striking Laurie Moloney, and severely reprimanded.
 Ron Andrews of Essendon was found not guilty of striking David McKay.
 Robin Close of Essendon was suspended for 2 weeks, for striking Phillip Pinnell.
 Laurie Moloney of Essendon was suspended for 2 weeks, for charging Phillip Pinnell.
 Neville Fields of Essendon was found not guilty of striking Rod Austin.
 At the end of the season, greatly dissatisfied with the approach of coach Des Tuddenham (especially his emphasis on "vigour" with players who were renowned for their skill), and disturbed by the fact that, under Tuddenham, Essendon had been involved in two massive brawls in two consecutive years, the committee of the Essendon Football Club sacked Tuddenham and paid out his contract.
Also, given the example of an injured John Nicholls in the 1973 Grand Final, and that of Tuddenham having his leg broken in the round 10 match against Richmond, Essendon now recognized the dangers of having its coach on the playing field and liable to injury.

References

Bibliography
 Hogan, P., The Tigers of Old, The Richmond Football Club, (Richmond), 1996. 
 Maplestone, M., Flying Higher: History of the Essendon Football Club 1872–1996, Essendon Football Club, (Melbourne), 1996. 
 Rogers, S. & Brown, A., Every Game Ever Played: VFL/AFL Results 1897–1997 (Sixth Edition), Viking Books, (Ringwood), 1998. 
 Ross, J. (ed), 100 Years of Australian Football 1897–1996: The Complete Story of the AFL, All the Big Stories, All the Great Pictures, All the Champions, Every AFL Season Reported, Viking, (Ringwood), 1996.

External links
 1975 Season - AFL Tables

Australian Football League seasons
VFL season